Joseph Hooker Shea (July 24, 1863 – December 23, 1928) was the United States Ambassador to Chile from 1916 to 1921.

Biography
He was born on July 24, 1862. Shea was a member of the Indiana Senate from 1897 to 1899.  He was a judge of the Fortieth Judicial Circuit of Indiana from 1906 to 1912, then a judge of the Indiana Court of Appeals from 1913 to 1916.

He was the United States Ambassador to Chile from May 30, 1916 to May 5, 1921.

He died on December 23, 1928. He was buried in Saint Patricks Catholic Cemetery  in Madison, Indiana.

References

External links

1863 births
1928 deaths
Ambassadors of the United States to Chile
Indiana state senators